As used for Egyptology, transliteration of Ancient Egyptian is the process of converting (or mapping) texts written as Egyptian language symbols to alphabetic symbols representing uniliteral hieroglyphs or their hieratic and demotic counterparts. This process facilitates the publication of texts where the inclusion of photographs or drawings of an actual Egyptian document is impractical.

Transliteration is not the same as transcription. Transliteration is the representation of written symbols in a consistent way in a different writing system, while transcription indicates the pronunciation of a text. For the case of Ancient Egyptian, precise details of the phonology are not known completely. Transcription systems for Ancient Egyptian do exist, but they rely on linguistic reconstruction (depending on evidence from the Coptic language and other details) and are thus theoretical in nature. Egyptologists rely on transliteration in scientific publications.

Standards

Important as transliteration is for Egyptology, there is no one standard scheme in use for hieroglyphic and hieratic texts. However, there are a few closely related systems that can be regarded as conventional. Many non-German-speaking Egyptologists use the system described in Gardiner 1954, whereas many German-speaking scholars opt for that used in the Wörterbuch der ägyptischen Sprache (Erman and Grapow 1926–1953), the standard dictionary of the ancient Egyptian language. However, there is a growing trend, even among English-speaking scholars, to adopt a modified version of the method used in the Wörterbuch (e.g., Allen 2000).

Although these conventional methods of transliteration have been used since the second half of the nineteenth century to the present time, there have been some attempts to adopt a modified system that seeks to use the International Phonetic Alphabet to a certain extent. The most successful of these is that developed by Wolfgang Schenkel (1990), and it is being used fairly widely in Germany and other German-speaking countries. More recent is a proposal by Thomas Schneider (2003) that is even closer to the IPA, but its usage is not presently common. The major criticism of both of these systems is that they give an impression of being scientifically accurate with regard to the pronunciation of Egyptian, though the actual accuracy is debatable. Moreover, the systems represent only the theoretical pronunciation of Middle Egyptian and not the older and later phases of the language, which are themselves to be transliterated with the same system.

Table of transliteration schemes

Although the system of Egyptian hieroglyphs is very complicated, there are only 24 consonantal phonemes distinguished, 
according to Edel (1955) transliterated and ordered alphabetically in the sequence:

A number of variant conventions are used interchangeably depending on the author.

The following table shows several transliteration schemes. The first column shows the uniliteral hieroglyph (see #Uniliteral signs below) corresponding to the sound.

The vowel  is conventionally inserted between consonants to make Egyptian words pronounceable in English.

Examples
The following text is transliterated below in some of the more common schemes. Note that most of the hieroglyphs in this text are not uniliteral signs, but can be found in the List of Egyptian hieroglyphs.

M23-X1:R4-X8-Q2:D4-W17-R14-G4-R8-O29:V30-U23-N26-D58-O49:Z1-F13:N31-Z2ss-V30:N16:N21*Z1-D45:N25
Unicode: 

(This text is conventionally translated into English as "an offering that the king gives; and Osiris, Foremost of Westerners [i.e., the Dead], the Great God, Lord of Abydos; and Wepwawet, Lord of the Sacred Land [i.e., the Necropolis]." It can also be translated "a royal offering of Osiris, Foremost of the Westerners, the Great God, Lord of Abydos; and of Wepwawet, Lord of the Sacred Land" [Allen 2000:§24.10].)

Erman and Grapow 1926–1953

 

Gardiner 1953
 

Buurman, Grimal, et al. 1988
 

A fully encoded, machine-readable version of the same text is:
 M23-X1:R4-X8-Q2:D4-W17-R14-G4-R8-O29:V30-U23-N26-D58-O49:Z1-F13:N31-Z2-V30:N16:N21*Z1-D45:N25

Schenkel 1991
 

Allen 2000
 

Schneider 2003

Demotic

As the latest stage of pre-Coptic Egyptian, demotic texts have long been transliterated using the same system(s) used for hieroglyphic and hieratic texts. However, in 1980, Demotists adopted a single, uniform, international standard based on the traditional system used for hieroglyphic, but with the addition of some extra symbols for vowels and other letters that were written in the demotic script. The Demotic Dictionary of the Oriental Institute of the University of Chicago (or CDD) utilises this method. As this system is likely only of interest to specialists, for details see the references below.

Encoding
In 1984 a standard, ASCII-based transliteration system was proposed by an international group of Egyptologists at the first Table ronde informatique et égyptologie and published in 1988 (see Buurman, Grimal, et al., 1988). This has come to be known as the Manuel de Codage (or MdC) system, based on the title of the publication, Inventaire des signes hiéroglyphiques en vue de leur saisie informatique: Manuel de codage des textes hiéroglyphiques en vue de leur saisie sur ordinateur. It is widely used in e-mail discussion lists and internet forums catering to professional Egyptologists and the interested public.

Although the Manuel de codage system allows for simple "alphabetic" transliterations, it also specifies a complex method for electronically encoding complete ancient Egyptian texts, indicating features such as the placement, orientation, and even size of individual hieroglyphs. This system is used (though frequently with modifications) by various computer programs developed for typesetting hieroglyphic texts (such as SignWriter, WinGlyph, MacScribe, InScribe, Glyphotext, WikiHiero, and others).

Unicode
With the introduction of the Latin Extended Additional block to Unicode version 1.1 (1992), the addition of Egyptological alef and ayin to Unicode version 5.1 (2008) and the addition of Glottal I alias Egyptological yod to Unicode version 12.0 (2019), it is now possible to fully transliterate Egyptian texts using a Unicode typeface. The following table lists only the special characters used for various transliteration schemes (see above).

Egyptological alef, ayin, and yod

Three characters that are specific to the discipline are required for transliterating Egyptian:
 Alef (two Semitistic alephs, one set over the other (Lepsius); approximated by the digit ⟨3⟩ in ASCII);
 Ayin (a Semitistic ayin);
 Yod (i with a Semitistic aleph instead of the dot, both yod and alef being considered possible sound values in the 19th century).

Although three Egyptological and Ugariticist letters were proposed in August 2000, it was not until 2008 (Unicode 5.1) two of the three letters were encoded: aleph and ayin (minor and capital). Another two proposals were made regarding the Egyptological yod, the eventual result of which was to accept the use of the Cyrillic psili pneumata as one of several possible diacritics for this purpose. The other options use the superscript comma (U+0313) and the right half ring above (U+0357). A new attempt for a sign called LETTER I WITH SPIRITUS LENIS was made in 2017. Within the Egyptological community objections were made concerning this name. The proposed name was changed to EGYPTOLOGICAL YOD before finally becoming GLOTTAL I.  The sign was added in March 2019 with the release of Unicode 12.0. One of the first fonts that implemented the full set of signs is New Athena Unicode.

Before the usage of the above-mentioned Unicode signs, various workarounds were in practice, e.g.

Uniliteral signs
Middle Egyptian is reconstructed as having had 24 consonantal phonemes. There is at least one hieroglyph with a phonetic value corresponding to each of these phonemes.

The table below gives a list of such "uniliteral signs" along with their conventional transcription and their conventional "Egyptological pronunciation" and probable phonetic value.

Many hieroglyphs are coloured, though the paint has worn off most stone inscriptions. Colors vary, but many glyphs are predominantly one colour or another, or a particular combination (such as red on the top and blue on the bottom). In some cases, two graphically similar glyphs may be distinguished solely by colour, though in other cases it's not known if the choice of colour had any meaning.

See also
 List of Egyptian hieroglyphs
 Egyptian biliteral signs
 Egyptian triliteral signs

References

Citations

Bibliography
 Allen, James Paul. 2000. Middle Egyptian: An Introduction to the Language and Culture of Hieroglyphs. Cambridge: Cambridge University Press.
 Buurman, Jan, Nicolas-Christophe Grimal, Michael Hainsworth, Jochen Hallof, and Dirk van der Plas. 1988. Inventaire des signes hiéroglyphiques en vue de leur saisie informatique: Manuel de codage des textes hiéroglyphiques en vue de leur saisie sur ordinateur. 3rd ed. Informatique et Égyptologie 2. Mémoires de l'Académie des Inscriptions et Belle-Lettres (Nouvelle Série) 8. Paris: Institut de France.
 Erman, Adolf, and Hermann Grapow, eds. 1926–1953. Wörterbuch der aegyptischen Sprache im Auftrage der deutschen Akademien. 6 vols. Leipzig: J. C. Hinrichs'schen Buchhandlungen. (Reprinted Berlin: Akademie-Verlag GmbH, 1971).
 Gardiner, Alan Henderson. 1957. Egyptian Grammar; Being an Introduction to the Study of Hieroglyphs. 3rd ed. Oxford: Griffith Institute.
 Hannig, Rainer. 1995. Großes Handwörterbuch Ägyptisch–Deutsch: die Sprache der Pharaonen (2800–950 v. Chr.). Kulturgeschichte der antiken Welt 64 (Hannig-Lexica 1). Mainz am Rhein: Verlag Philipp von Zabern.
 Kammerzell, Frank. 2005. Old Egyptian and Pre-Old Egyptian: Tracing linguistic diversity in Archaic Egypt and the creation of the Egyptian language. In: Texte und Denkmäler des ägyptischen Alten Reiches, ed. by Stephan Johannes Seidlmayer. Thesaurus Linguae Aegyptiae 3. Berlin: Achet, 165–247. 
 Schenkel, Wolfgang. 1990.Einführung in die altägyptische Sprachwissenschaft. Orientalistische Einführungen. Darmstadt: Wissenschaftliche Buchgesellschaft.
 Schneider, Thomas. 2003. "Etymologische Methode, die Historizität der Phoneme und das ägyptologische Transkriptionsalphabet."Lingua aegyptia: Journal of Egyptian Language Studies 11:187–199.

External links

 Manuel de Codage: technical details of electronic transliteration of Egyptian texts
 Unicode-based transliteration system adopted by the Institut Français d'Archéologie Orientale. Description and downloadable keyboard layouts.
 Online encoding converter for converting ASCII-based transliterations into Unicode.

Ancient Egyptian language
Egyptology
Romanization by script

Writing systems introduced in the 19th century